Archips subsidiarius is a moth of the family Tortricidae. It is found in Vietnam and Kashmir, India.

References

Moths described in 1924
Archips
Moths of Asia